A Man Called Hawk is an American action drama series, starring Avery Brooks, that ran on ABC from January 28 to May 13, 1989.  The series is a spin-off of the crime drama series Spenser: For Hire, and features the character Hawk, who first appeared in the 1976 novel Promised Land, the fourth in the series of Spenser novels by mystery writer Robert B. Parker.

Main cast
On the air for just thirteen episodes, A Man Called Hawk starred Avery Brooks as the title character, who has relocated from Boston to his hometown, Washington, D.C. The series co-starred actor Moses Gunn, who portrayed a father figure to Hawk known only as "Old Man".

Hawk's character description

On Spenser: For Hire, the character of Hawk was defined by his sharp outfits, streetwise manner, sunglasses (worn even at night), BMW 635csi and the incredibly large long-barreled Colt Python .357 Magnum revolver that he carried with him nearly everywhere.  He most often acted as a street resource for his private detective friend Spenser.  Notably, Hawk had a clean shaven head, well before Michael Jordan and other celebrities popularized the look in the 1990s.

After spinning off to his own series, Hawk became less of an anti-hero and more of a traditional champion of people that needed help and could not fight for themselves. A deeper personal history was developed for the character, and Hawk became more of a Renaissance man, displaying talents for boxing, chess, playing jazz, and an appreciation of fine African art.

Production
A Man Called Hawk was a spin-off of the recently cancelled Spenser: For Hire, which aired on ABC from 1985 through 1988. Brooks co-wrote the theme music for the show with jazz legends Stanley Clarke and Butch Morris, the latter of whom also did most of the incidental music for the show.

The series was filmed in Washington D.C.

During the first three seasons of Star Trek: Deep Space Nine, Brooks wore a full head of hair and shaved his goatee, as a means of distinguishing his character Benjamin Sisko from Hawk. The goatee was added to Sisko's look near the end of Season 3, and his head was shaved bald at the start of Season 4 (this was due in part to production of DS9 concurring with that of a series of Spenser: For Hire reunion films in which Brooks reprised Hawk).

Episodes

Notable guest stars
 Angela Bassett
 Keith David
William Fichtner 
 Samuel L. Jackson
 Delroy Lindo
Joe Morton 
 Wesley Snipes

Hawk in subsequent films
Avery Brooks reprised the role of Hawk in four subsequent TV movies: Spenser: Ceremony (1993), Spenser: Pale Kings and Princes (1994), Spenser: The Judas Goat (1994), and Spenser: A Savage Place (1995).  Each is considered a sequel to Spenser: For Hire.

Additionally, the character Hawk appeared in two TV movies with no connection to either Spenser: For Hire or A Man Called Hawk.  In Spenser: Small Vices (1999), Hawk was portrayed by Shiek Mahmud-Bey.  In Walking Shadow (2001), the role went to Ernie Hudson. See Spenser (TV movies).

Syndication 
The series was re-aired in reruns on TV One in 2006.

The series is currently available for streaming online on Tubi.

See also

 Spenser: For Hire
 Spenser (character)

References

External links
 

American Broadcasting Company original programming
American television spin-offs
Television series by Warner Bros. Television Studios
Television shows set in Washington, D.C.
1980s American crime television series
1980s American drama television series
1989 American television series debuts
1989 American television series endings
Television shows based on American novels